Elham or Ilham may refer to: 

 Elham (given name), list of people with the name
 Elham (surname), list of people with the surname
 Elham, Kent
 Elham railway station
 Elham Deanery
 Elham Valley Railway
 Elham Valley

See also
 Ilham & Wahi, a form of revelation in Islam